Chakori Sher Ghazi is a town and union council of Gujrat District, in the Punjab province of Pakistan. It is part of Kharian Tehsil and is located at 32°40'30N 73°57'40E and has  an altitude of 253 metres (833 feet).

References

Union councils of Gujrat District
Populated places in Gujrat District